The Muslim Kayastha, also known as Siddiqui, are a community of Muslims, are related to the Kayastha of northern India, mainly modern Uttar Pradesh, who were  reverted to Islam during the rule of the Islamic empires in India.

History and origin
The Kayastha community has historically converted to Islam and held the occupations of land record keeping, administration and accounting. They speak Urdu, although they are also fluent in Hindi in India. in Pakistan they also speak Sindhi and Punjabi. They consider themselves part of the Shaikh community, and claim to be the descendants of Abu Bakr, the first Sunni Caliph, who was a companion of and the father-in-law of Muhammad.

The Muslim dynasties recruited individuals from different Hindu castes by merit and trained them to become civil servants and members of the Kayasth caste. They successfully adapted as scribes and functionaries under Islamic rule, then the British. In the reign of the Mughals, a number of educated upper caste Hindus with sharp intellects attained administrative positions through rapid adaptation to the Persian language and culture of these new rulers of South Asia. These influential upper caste Hindus formed the Kayastha, whose secular viewpoint and adaptability allowed them to succeed. Their close association with Muslim rulers led most of them to convert to Islam.

Most South Asian kingdoms and princely states valued Kayasthas as desired citizens or immigrants in the second millennium. They treated the Kayasthas more as a community than a Hindu caste, because they developed expertise in Persian (the state language in Islamic India), and learned Turkish and Arabic, economics, administration and taxation. This gave them an edge over the Brahmins, the priestly Hindu caste) who traditionally reserved the study of Sanskrit shastras for themselves.  Muslim Kayastha outnumber the Hindu Kayastha even today.  They adapted to change, such as the advent of the British Raj. They learned English, and the more affluent sent their children to school in the United Kingdom. They became civil servants, tax officers, junior administrators, teachers, legal helpers and barristers, and rose to the highest positions accessible to natives in British India.

Distribution

India
The Muslim Kayasth live in the northern Indian states of Haryana, Himachal Pradesh, Uttarakhand, Uttar Pradesh and Bihar and also in other states: Jharkhand, West Bengal, Telangana, Madhya Pradesh and Maharashtra. In Uttar Pradesh, the Muslim Kayasth live in the urban and semi-urban centers of the state. There is also a large community in Delhi, capital of India.

Pakistan
After the independence in 1947, many Muslim Kayasthas migrated and settled in the provinces of Sindh and Punjab in Pakistan. In Sindh province, they are mainly settled in the urban centers especially in Karachi, Hyderabad and Sukkur. In Punjab province, they have settled in Lahore, Rawalpindi, Multan and Faisalabad. There is also large community also in Islamabad, the capital of Pakistan.

See also
 Shaikhs in South Asia
 Siddiqui
 Muhajirs

References

Muslim communities of Uttar Pradesh
Social groups of Uttar Pradesh
Social groups of Pakistan
Shaikh clans
Kayastha